Hiya is a common variant of the word "Hello". It may also refer to:
Hiya (film), a 2016 Korean film
Hiya (company), an American caller profile company
Hiya (plant), a genus of ferns in the family Dennstaedtiaceae
Kiai, the short yell uttered by martial artists, commonly rendered in forms such as "Hi-yah!"